The Dooley and Pals Show, sometimes shortened to just Dooley and Pals, is an American  children's television series.

The main character is Dooley, a friendly alien who has landed in a backyard on Earth. He explores the planet with the children of the neighborhood as his guides. The show is meant to teach moral values and educational basics to preschoolers.

The secular version is produced by the Michael Gerber-fronted Victory Television for South Carolina ETV, while one of Victory's shareholders, the Channel Islands-based Wardley Investments, Ltd., produced a 2002 repackaging of the original PBS program, albeit with religious messages.

History
Dooley, originally called "Dinky," was first developed in the late 1980s by Mark Riddle and Kevin Barry. The concept was pitched to several production companies, including Hanna-Barbera. Along with Gary Zeidenstein, Riddle and Barry eventually formed Mr. Z's Animation and Production Corp, and along with Scripps Howard Broadcasting produced ten television pilots at WCET, PBS's Cincinnati outlet. The ten pilots for the series (then called The Dooley Show) aired in 25 PBS stations between July 15 and August 31, 1996. This first Dooley series won three Emmys. While some ideas used in the pilots would later return in The Dooley and Pals Show, the basic premise, and Dooley himself, differed greatly. The original Dooley was a green lizard-like creature. According to the pilots' press release he was "species unknown... he's just a friend, another kid, but not from this world... he was born on a star." The ten pilots found Maxx (then played by Caralyn Collar) and her six friends playing with Dooley in the attic of Maxx's home. Other characters included Coach (a barn owl), Chatter (a squirrel), Polly (an opossum), and Parker (a bird). Maxx's grandmother, as well as a magical mail carrier, were also featured strongly. Dooley was originally played by Ken Jones.  Jones served as the head writer for the series as well as the voice for Dooley and other characters including Coach and Cosmos.  Suzanne Fitzpatrick served as the supervising producer during the development of the series at Disney/MGM Studios transitioning Dooley from the original 'dinosaur' concept to the space boy. The secular version is syndicated to educational and PBS member stations by South Carolina ETV. The show was later purchased by MGM Studios/Walt Disney Company and was produced in Orlando, Florida until 2003 when production was canceled.

Characters
Dooley (Ken Jones, David Maida): An alien who has landed his spaceship in the backyard of a house on Earth. He wants to learn all about the people and environment of Earth, while teaching the children of the neighborhood about interpersonal skills.
M.A.R.T.I.E. (Michael Stevens): "Mechanical Assistant Robot That Interacts with Everyone"—M.A.R.T.I.E. for short—is Dooley's robot sidekick, who has a tendency to mangle words. He has a data bank filled with facts about Earth concepts, which he accesses whenever Dooley needs more information about an idea.
Cosmos (Ken Jones) and Zoom (Michael Stevens): A pair of fuzzy alien stowaways (represented by puppets) who appear in comical interstitials throughout the show, illustrating the main lessons.
Mom (Ginger Lee McDermott): The mother who lives in the house where Dooley landed his spaceship. She acts as a voice of experience and guidance as Dooley, M.A.R.T.I.E. and the children learn various lessons.
Nick (Joshua Gangelhoff): The boy who lives in the house; Mom's son and Maxx's brother. Some people call him Nicholas.
Maxx (Erika Brooke Bradley): The girl who lives in the house; Mom's daughter and Nick's sister. She was played by Caralyn Collar in the original pilots.
Michael (Eric Battle): One of the children in the neighborhood.
Chris (Justenn Notario):  Maxx's youngest boyfriend.
Kayla (Nicole Marion): The "new kid" in the neighborhood, who arrives in the first episode. She is Dr. Arvid's daughter.
Ashley (Kaitlyn O'Fray): One of the neighborhood children, Maxx's oldest best friend and Nick's girlfriend.
Ms. Z. (Davonda Simmons): The letter carrier for the neighborhood; she delivers Dooley's "Letter of the Day" (an actual physical representation of an alphabet letter, usually the first letter of the word that best describes the show's theme) and "Picture Pals" (viewer-submitted drawings which Dooley displays during this segment). Ms. Z also acts as a voice of wisdom and advisor to the group, often introducing solutions to their problems through songs.
Dr. Arvid (Arvid Edward II): Kayla's father, a veterinarian who often stops by bringing an animal for the children to interact with.

Episode list

References

External links
 

PBS Kids shows
1993 American television series debuts
1999 American television series endings
2000s American children's television series
2000s preschool education television series
American preschool education television series
South Carolina Educational Television
American television series with live action and animation
American television shows featuring puppetry
English-language television shows
Television series about extraterrestrial life